The Kadia, or Kadiya is a term or title used to refer to a mason or persons involved in masonry in India. Many caste's person such as Koli, Kachhia, Gola, Chhipa, Sathwara, Kanbi, Kumbhar, Gurjar adopted the masonry and known as Kadia.

Distribution 
The Kadias are distributed in whole of the Gujarat but Hindu Kadias are found in Junagad, Vadodara, Surat, Amreli and Jamnagar districts of state and Muslim Kadias are distributed in Vadodara, Ahmedabad and Surat districts.

Clans of Koli Kadia 
There are some prominent clans of Koli Kadias of Gujarat.
 Solanki
 Bamania
 Baria
 Rathod
 Chudasama
 Makwana

These clans are common in all subcastes of Koli caste.

See also
Mistri

References

Indian words and phrases
Indian architectural history